Jitendra Singh (born 13 June 2001) is an Indian professional footballer who plays as a defender or defensive midfielder for Jamshedpur in the Indian Super League. He has represented India in the FIFA U-17 World Cup in 2017.

Club career
Born in Kolkata, Singh was part of the AIFF Elite Academy batch that was preparing for the 2017 FIFA U-17 World Cup to be hosted in India. After the tournament, Singh was selected to play for the Indian Arrows, an All India Football Federation-owned team that would consist of India under-20 players to give them playing time. He made his professional debut for the side in the Arrow's first match of the season against Chennai City. He started and helped the team keep the clean sheet as Indian Arrows won 3–0.

A month later, on 26 December, Singh scored his first professional goal against Shillong Lajong. His 19th-minute goal was the first in a 3–0 victory for the Indian Arrows.

International career
Singh represented the India under-17 side which participated in the 2017 FIFA U-17 World Cup which was hosted in India. He also played in the 2019 Granatkin Memorial tournament.

Career statistics

Club

References

2001 births
Living people
Indian footballers
AIFF Elite Academy players
Indian Arrows players
Association football defenders
Footballers from Kolkata
I-League players
India youth international footballers
Indian Super League players
Jamshedpur FC players